Kronprinsessegade 40 is a listed property located at the corner of Kronprinsessegade and Dronningens Tværgade in central Copenhagen, Denmark.

History
The building was constructed by   Thomas Blom (1777-1841) in 1811. Blom and his wife Ingeborg née Cathrine Carstensen (died 1860) moved into one of the apartments of the new building. They had seven children over the following eight-year period: Johanne Emilie Blom (1812-1896), Peter Ludvig Blom (1814-1850), Julius Andreas Blom (1815-1900), Sigvard August Blom (1816-1900), Ida Wilhelmine Blom (1818-1896), Carl Waldemar Blom (1819-ca.1838) and Julie Georgine Blom (1820-1885). In 1825, Blom and his family moved two houses down the street after he had completed a new building at Kronprinsessegade 36.

The organist and composer Johan Christian Gebauer (1808-1884) was among the residents from 1839 to 1841. The politician Andreas Frederik Krieger was a resident in around 1840 and again in 1845-1857. The writer Hans Egede Schack (1820-1859) was a resident in 1848. Athalia Schwartz (1821-1871) was a ramong the residents in 1849. Holger Drachmann (1846-1908) resided on the third floor in 1860-1864.

Architecture
The building consists of four storeys over a high cellar. It has five bays towards Kronprinsessegade, a chamfered corner bay and seven bays towards Dronningens Tværgade.

Today

References

External links

Listed residential buildings in Copenhagen
Thomas Blom buildings
Residential buildings completed in 1811
1811 establishments in Denmark